The Morley War Memorial is a British national war memorial situated in Scatcherd Park, Morley, Leeds, England. Sculpted by Walter Henry Gilbert and cast by H. H. Martyn and Co., it was unveiled 21 May 1927 by Alderman Joseph Kirk and accepted by Mayor Alderman Thomas Marshall. The war memorial was added to the National Heritage List for England on 17 June 1986 as a Grade II listed structure.

This memorial commemorates the residents of Morley who were killed in the First World War, with 453 names and the Second World War with 110 names. It was renovated in 2008 and rededicated 29 June the same year.

Description

The memorial consists of a statue cast in bronze surmounting a granite plinth, the statue portrays Britannia in a Roman dress holding a trident aloft in her right hand and a statue of a winged man kneeling on one knee in her left hand, symbolising "victory". Located on her bodice is the royal emblem of 3 rampant lions, she is also wearing an elaborate plumed helmet with seahorses to either side. It is 22 feet tall including both statue and plinth.

Behind is a wall bearing name panels. The panels on the left gives us the names of those from Morley and Churwell,  while the one on the right lists those from, Gildersome, Drighlington, East Ardsley and West Ardsley. At the base of the plinth a small plaque entitled "Also Remembered" was added in June 2008 listing a further 11 names.

Inscription

The inscription remains legible, it is located on the pedestal of the figure and reads:

Gallery

See also
Listed buildings in Morley, West Yorkshire

References 

Buildings and structures completed in 1927
Monuments and memorials in West Yorkshire
Morley, West Yorkshire
World War I memorials in England
World War II memorials in England